Joseph Torres, better known as J. Torres, is a Filipino-born Canadian comic book writer. He is perhaps best known for his run on DC Comics' Teen Titans Go!. He has also done some writing for animation and television.

Early life
Torres was born in Manila and raised in Montreal, Quebec where he was educated at McGill University. Before writing comic books, Torres was an ESL instructor. He is married, has two children, and currently resides in Toronto, Ontario.

Career

Comics
The writer debuted with the semi-autobiographical Copybook Tales, first published by Slave Labor Graphics in the early 90s and then later collected and reprinted by Oni Press. Next came Siren, a three-part miniseries published by Image Comics. Both titles were co-created with artist Tim Levins whom Torres had first met in high school.

In 2002, Oni published Alison Dare, co-created by J. Bone, the first of a number of critically acclaimed all-ages titles for both the writer and publisher. Sidekicks with Takeshi Miyazawa came next, followed by Jason and the Argobots with Mike Norton, and Days Like This with Scott Chantler.

After some short assignments at Marvel Comics on titles like Black Panther, X-Men: Ronin, and X-Men Unlimited, Torres then went on to write the fan-favorite Teen Titans Go! for DC Comics until the series was canceled after a 55-issue run (it was initially scheduled to end with issue #48 but a fan-driven campaign to save the title got it a temporary stay of execution).

With Teen Titans Go, Torres began to carve out a niche for himself as a popular and successful writer of kids comics. He went on to contribute to a handful of Johnny DC titles including Cartoon Network Block Party, Batman Strikes, Legion of Super Heroes in the 31st Century, and the short-lived creator owned Family Dynamic.

However, during this time he also contributed to some decidedly more mature titles such as Batman: Legends of the Dark Knight, Blue Beetle, Ninja Scroll, Wonder Girl, and Wonder Woman.

His subsequent credits include Batman: The Brave and the Bold for DC, WALL-E for Boom Studios, and Power Lunch for Oni Press.

He also wrote for and helped edit the "Yo Gabba Gabba: Comic Book Time" anthology for Oni and is currently editing the forthcoming "True Patriot" Canadian superhero anthology.

Torres' upcoming projects include the second volumes of "Bigfoot Boy" for Kids Can Press and Jinx for Archie Comics.

On March 7, 2018, Rick and Morty Presents: The Vindicators was published by Oni Press, written by Torres with art by CJ Cannon, following Rick and Morty as they meet the All-New Vindicators.

Other media
In 2006, Torres penned the Degrassi: Extra Credit series of graphic novels from Simon & Schuster as well as contributed writing to the Degrassi: The Next Generation animated and live action webisodes (a.k.a. Degrassi Minis). Although the Extra Credit series underperformed, despite being the first graphic novel advertised on Canadian network television, they helped increase Torres' profile especially in the book industry.

Torres has also written chapter books and activity books for Scholastic and Simon Says, short stories and comic strips for magazines including Kayak, YTV's Whoa, and Nickelodeon Magazine (to which he contributed Avatar: The Last Airbender comics). He was also a staff writer on the Rugrats daily syndicated newspaper comic strip.

His animation credits include Oh No! It's An Alien Invasion, Hi Hi Puffy Ami Yumi, Edgar & Ellen, and League of Super Evil.

Awards
The comics Torres has worked on have earned nominations for the prestigious Eisner Award (Alison Dare), "Best Title for Younger Readers" (2003), Harvey Award (Sidekicks, 2001), and Shuster Award for which he has been nominated six times. He won the Shuster for "Outstanding Canadian Writer" in 2006 for his work on Batman: Legends of the Dark Knight, Love as a Foreign Language, and Teen Titans Go. His graphic novels Days Like This and Lola: A Ghost Story were also listed by YALSA in 2004 and 2010 respectively. Most recently "Bigfoot Boy" was a 2012 Junior Library Guild selection and also named one of Kirkus Reviews' Best Children's Books 2012.

Bibliography
 Brobots (with Sean Dove, Oni Press)
 Vol 1: ...and the Kajiu Kerfuffle!
 Vol 2: ...and the Mecha Marlarkey!
 The Copybook Tales (with Tim Levins, Oni Press)
 Days Like This (with Scott Chantler, Oni Press)
 Jason and the Argobots (with Mike Norton, Oni Press):
 Vol. 1: Birthquake
 Vol. 2: Machina Ex Deus
 Legion of Super Heroes in the 31st Century #1–2, 5–6, 11, 13 and 17–19
 Love As A Foreign Language Omnibus 1
 Ninja Scroll, Wildstorm, 2006=2007, tpb, July 2007) 
 Scandalous (with Scott Chantler, Oni Press)
 Sidekicks: The Transfer Student (with Takeshi Miyazawa, Oni Press)
 Teen Titans Go! Digest (with Todd Nauck, DC Comics):
 Vol. 1: Truth, Justice, Pizza
 Vol. 2: Heroes on Patrol
 Vol. 3: Bring It On
 Vol. 4: Ready for Action
 Vol. 5: On the Move
 Vol. 6: Titans Together (Trade Paperback, but continued the issue numbering)
 X-Men: Ronin (Marvel Mangaverse) (with Makoto Nakatsuka, Marvel Comics)
 X-Men Unlimited (by Various, Marvel Comics)

Notes

External links

Interviews
Interview with cIndycenter.com Podcast
Interview with Wired
Publishers Weekly interview

Canadian comics writers
Filipino emigrants to Canada
Naturalized citizens of Canada
Living people
Writers from Manila
Writers from Montreal
Writers from Toronto
Year of birth missing (living people)
Joe Shuster Award winners for Outstanding Writer
McGill University alumni